Andrew Victor Boyens is a New Zealand international footballer who plays and coaches with amateur side Forrest Hill Milford. Boyens has represented New Zealand at the international level.

Career

College
Boyens spent his childhood in Napier where he was born on 18 September 1983 and moved to Dunedin at age 16. He was educated at Kavanagh College and the University of Otago, completing a BA in 2004. He started his playing career in New Zealand, playing for University of Otago and semi-professional club Dunedin Technical before transferring to University of New Mexico in 2004, where he was named a first-team All-American in 2006.

Professional
After briefly playing for Otago United in the New Zealand Football Championship, Boyens was drafted in the first round of the 2007 MLS SuperDraft by Toronto FC. He scored his first MLS goal off a corner in a 2–1 win over the Colorado Rapids on 2 June 2007. He was released by Toronto FC on 14 April 2008.

Boyens went on trial at New York Red Bulls in April 2008, and signed with the team on 5 May 2008. He appeared in 19 matches during the MLS regular season. After an up and down season Boyens' solid play in central defence helped Red Bulls pull off a surprising first-round upset in the MLS playoffs, defeating defending champion Houston Dynamo 4–1 on aggregate.

After appearing in 41 official matches for the club in three years, New York Red Bulls announced that Boyens would not be part of their plans for the 2011 MLS season. He signed with Chivas USA on 9 February 2011. At season's end, Chivas USA declined his 2012 contract option and he entered the 2011 MLS Re-Entry Draft. Boyens was selected by Los Angeles Galaxy in stage 2 of the draft on 12 December 2011. He signed with Los Angeles on 30 January 2012.

After the conclusion of the 2012 season, LA declined the 2013 option on Boyens's contract and he entered the 2012 MLS Re-Entry Draft. Boyens went undrafted in both rounds of the draft.

Return to New Zealand
Following a stint as a head coach within the LA Galaxy Youth Academy, Boyens returned to New Zealand football in February 2014 when he was named as the new Football Development Officer for the Waitakere region. He began playing with amateur club Forrest Hill Milford, where he also serves as assistant coach. Boyens resumed his professional career when he signed with New Zealand side Waitakere United on 20 October 2014. Waitakere cut ties with Boyens following the 2014–15 season.

International
Boyens was included in the New Zealand squad for a series of matches against Malaysia in February 2006, but did not play in any of them. He made his national team debut in an unofficial friendly later that year, when he came on as a substitute during New Zealand's 5–1 loss to Spanish club Sevilla FC on 15 August.

Boyens' first official international appearance came in May 2007, when New Zealand drew with Wales 2–2. The Observer noted that the defensive back two pairing of Boyens and Ben Sigmund were "boasting 10 minutes international experience between them".

He was named in the 2009 FIFA Confederations Cup New Zealand squad, and gifted David Villa Spain's fifth goal when he "air shot" a routine clearance during Spain's 5–0 rout over New Zealand on Sunday 14 June.

On 10 May 2010, Boyens was named in New Zealand's final 23-man squad to compete at the 2010 FIFA World Cup.

Club career statistics

Honors

New York Red Bulls
Major League Soccer Western Conference Championship (1): 2008

See also
 New Zealand national football team
 New Zealand at the FIFA World Cup
 New Zealand national football team results
 List of New Zealand international footballers

References

External links

NZ Football Profile

1983 births
Living people
All-American men's college soccer players
Association football defenders
Association footballers from Dunedin
Chivas USA players
LA Galaxy players
LA Galaxy non-playing staff
Major League Soccer players
New Mexico Lobos men's soccer players
New York Red Bulls players
New Zealand association footballers
New Zealand international footballers
People educated at Trinity Catholic College, Dunedin
Toronto FC draft picks
Toronto FC players
University of Otago alumni
2004 OFC Nations Cup players
2008 OFC Nations Cup players
2009 FIFA Confederations Cup players
2010 FIFA World Cup players
New Zealand expatriate association footballers
Expatriate soccer players in Canada
Expatriate soccer players in the United States
New Zealand expatriate sportspeople in the United States
New Zealand expatriate sportspeople in Canada